Kenneth Johnston Rheam (September 28, 1893 – October 23, 1947) was a professional baseball player from 1914 to 1915. He went to Indiana University of Pennsylvania. He was born in Pittsburgh, Pennsylvania and died in Pittsburgh, Pennsylvania. He played for the Pittsburgh Rebels.

References

Major League Baseball infielders
Pittsburgh Rebels players
Baseball players from Pittsburgh
1893 births
1947 deaths
Burials at Allegheny Cemetery